Meadows are a habitat where grasses predominate.

Meadows may also refer to:

 Meadows (surname), an English surname, including a list of people with the name
 Meadows, Newfoundland and Labrador, a town near Corner Brook, Newfoundland, Canada
 L'Anse aux Meadows, the remains of a Viking village in Newfoundland
 Meadows, Illinois, an unincorporated community located near Peoria
 Meadows, Maryland, an unincorporated community near Joint Base Andrews
 New Meadows, Idaho, a town in the Meadows Valley, on the Little Salmon River
 Meadows, South Australia, a town in the Adelaide Hills
 The Meadow Building, Christ Church, Oxford, England, known locally as "Meadows"

See also
 Meadow (disambiguation)
 The Meadows (disambiguation)
 Mountain Meadows (disambiguation)